The A8 motorway is a motorway in the Netherlands. It starts at the intersection with the Ring Amsterdam (the A10 motorway) at interchange Coenplein, and leads past Oostzaan, interchange Zaandam, and Zaandijk towards its terminus, not even 10 kilometers from its beginning at the Coenplein, near Assendelft.

Overview
In the 1970s, this road was planned to be extended for about 5 extra kilometers towards the A9 motorway, between the interchange Beverwijk and the exit Heemskerk. However, due to the rising oil prices and the congestion which was already a problem at the A10 near the Coenplein, it was decided not to do so after all.

N8 

Currently, along parts of the N246 and N203 roads, signs are placed with the number N8, to direct the motorist from the terminus of the A8 motorway towards the exit Uitgeest of the A9 motorway. However, the N8 is not part of the so-called Rijksweg 8, which only consists of the motorway part between the Coenplein and Assendelft.

Exit list

External links

Motorways in the Netherlands
Motorways in North Holland
Transport in Amsterdam
Oostzaan
Zaanstad